Enzo Cozzolini (January 3, 1924 – September 30, 1962) was an Italian professional football player. He was born in Rome. He played 2 games in the Serie A in the 1942/43 season for A.S. Roma.

References
Profile of Enzo Cozzolini 

1924 births
1962 deaths
Italian footballers
Serie A players
A.S. Roma players
Empoli F.C. players
Brescia Calcio players
Catania S.S.D. players
Piacenza Calcio 1919 players
Association football midfielders